Marco Conti (born 14 April 1969) is Captain Regent of San Marino together with Glauco Sansovini for the semester from 1 April 2010 to 1 October 2010.

References

1969 births
Living people
Captains Regent of San Marino
Members of the Grand and General Council
People from Rimini
Sammarinese Christian Democratic Party politicians
Italian people of Sammarinese descent